Jackie Brown is a 1997 crime film directed by Quentin Tarantino.

Jackie Brown may also refer to:

Music
Jackie Brown: Music from the Miramax Motion Picture, a 1997 soundtrack to the film
"Jackie Brown", a 1989 song by John Mellencamp from Big Daddy
Jackie Brown Jr, an Australian indie rock/soul band featuring rapper DOBBY

People
Jackie Brown (English boxer) (1909–1971), English flyweight boxer
Jackie Brown (footballer) (1914–1990), Irish footballer of the 1930s
Jackie Brown (Scottish boxer) (1935–2020), Scottish flyweight boxer
Jackie Brown (baseball) (1943–2017), American baseball pitcher
Jackie Brown (swimmer), English swimmer

See also
Jack Brown (disambiguation)
John Brown (disambiguation)
Jacky Brown (born 1975), Cape Verdean rapper

Brown, Jackie